Thon-Samson is a village of Wallonia and a district of the municipality of Andenne, located in the province of Namur, Belgium.

Thon-Samson is a member of the Les Plus Beaux Villages de Wallonie ("The Most Beautiful Villages of Wallonia") association.

References

External links

Former municipalities of Namur (province)
Sub-municipalities of Andenne